The Gerald Ratner Athletics Center is a $51 million athletics facility within the University of Chicago campus in the Hyde Park community area on the South Side of Chicago, Illinois in the United States. The building was named after University of Chicago alumnus, Gerald Ratner. The architect of this suspension structure that is supported by masts, cables and counterweights was César Pelli, who is best known as the architect of the Petronas Towers.

The Ratner Athletics Center was approved for use in September 2003. The facility includes, among other things: a competition gymnasium, a multilevel fitness facility, an Olympic-sized swimming pool, a multipurpose dance studio, meeting room space, and athletic department offices.  It serves as home to several of the university's athletic teams and has hosted numerous National Collegiate Athletic Association Division III regional and University Athletic Association conference championship events.

Located at the southwest corner of Ellis Avenue and 55th Street, the Ratner Center has an award-winning design that uses a complex external mast-and-counterweight system instead of interior support devices, allowing for large open-space areas inside the building. Cesar Pelli & Associates Inc. was credited as the design architect and OWP/P was the architect of record.

History
A ceremonial groundbreaking was held for the Ratner Center on October 28, 2000. The Ratner Center opened to the public on September 29, 2003, although it was not officially dedicated until homecoming weekend on October 11. The building, which represented a collaboration between Cesar Pelli & Associates and Chicago's OWP/P, was the first new athletic facility on the University of Chicago campus in 68 years.  It was a part of a $500 million University-wide capital improvement plan that occurred between 1999 and 2005.  Part of the plan included the Pelli-designed parking structure across the street from the Athletics Center.  The parking structure is named the Gerald Ratner Athletics Center Parking Structure.  The athletic center is known for its innovative asymmetrically supported cable-stayed structural system and S-shaped roofs.  It is composed of a masted building to the north containing the Myers-McLoraine Swimming Pool, a masted building to the south containing the gymnasia, and a central building containing the Bernard DelGiorno fitness center.

Ratner, Ph.B.,’35, J.D.,’37, contributed $15 million toward the $51 million cost.  He was a Phi Beta Kappa graduate and played for the baseball team during the time that the university participated in the Big Ten Conference. After graduating from the law school, Order of the Coif, he eventually founded his own law firm Gould & Ratner in 1949.  Helen Myers McLoraine, also an alumnus from the 1930s, contributed in excess of $5 million to fund the swimming pool.  Bernard DelGiorno — a gymnast with many degrees from the university:  AB’54, AB’55, MBA’55 — has made numerous donations including a $5 million one in 2006 to fund athletic facilities as well as other infrastructure on campus. DelGiorno worked in industrial relations and personnel at a steel plant before becoming a stockbroker for Paine Webber, which became a part of UBS Financial Services.

Details
The building features the  x  Myers-McLoraine Swimming Pool, which can be configured with up to 20 lanes in the 25-yard dimension and nine lanes in the 50-meter dimension. The pool's configuration is flexible with a moveable bulkhead which allows for simultaneous activities. It also has a pair of one-meter diving boards. The  competition natatorium features seating for 350 spectators.

The building also includes the Bernard DelGiorno fitness center.  The DelGiorno Fitness Center facility occupies two levels of the Ratner center plus the rotunda area.  In addition to a general fitness center, it includes a multipurpose dance studio; classroom and meeting room space; permanent and day lockers and locker rooms; the University of Chicago Athletics Hall of Fame; and the athletic department offices.

The building also features a competition gym and auxiliary gym, both of which are available to recreational users. The competition gym, which is the southernmost building, accommodates practice and game site for varsity basketball, volleyball, and wrestling, but is convertible into two recreational courts.  The auxiliary gym is multipurpose and can accommodate indoor soccer, as well as basketball, volleyball, and badminton.

Use
The Ratner Center also serves as the home of the University of Chicago basketball, volleyball, and wrestling teams. The 1,658-seat competition gymnasium has played host to the 2004, 2007 and 2010 University Athletic Association Wrestling Championships and the 2006 NCAA Division III Great Lakes Regional Wrestling Championship.  The building also hosted the 2009 University Athletic Association Women's Volleyball Championship. The Myers-McLoraine Swimming Pool was the site of the 2005 University Athletic Association Swimming and Diving Championship.  It also hosted swimming at the 2006 Gay Games.

The center is available to university and hospital faculty, staff, alumni, and retirees as well as their spouses and children on a paid membership basis and registered students for free. , the University of Chicago is one of the few remaining universities in the United States to have a swimming requirement for its undergraduate degree program.  Aside from the military service academies and a few of the Ivy League schools only a half dozen Universities had such a requirement as of 2006.  The swimming pool is the location of the administration of the two-lap requirement.  The facilities memberships are available to students as well as University and hospital faculty, staff, alumni and retirees, as well as spouses and children.  Registered students' memberships are free.

The building is complemented at the university by its predecessors the Henry Crown Field House and the modern incarnation of Stagg Field, which will continue to augment the athletic facilities needs of the campus patrons. Features of the indoor Henry Crown Field House include a 200-meter indoor running track; racquetball, handball and squash courts; multipurpose courts; a multipurpose room; and cardiovascular and weight training equipment. The Stagg Field outdoor complex includes a 400-meter track, eight tennis courts, and fields for baseball, softball, American football and soccer.

Design

The construction employed  of steel.  The  roof of the gym is supported by a pair of  steel masts. The pool's roof is supported by three masts. Each mast is composed of three  diameter steel hollow structural sections (HSS) filled with high-strength concrete that are arranged in a tapered tied-column configuration.

They are inclined at a 10 degree angle from vertical. Each tapered composite mast that supports the flattened S-shaped roof girders is supported by 15 splaying cables; 9 fore-stay cables and 6 backstay cables. During construction, the masts were filled with  cast-in-place concrete using innovative pumping techniques.

Concrete counterweights totaling  — with some as large as  — counteract the weight of the roof from below the ground.  The masts and counterweights are likened as external form-giving elements to flying buttresses in gothic architecture, which predominates the campus' architecture.  The building is said to interpret gothic architecture through structural expressionism. The exterior support design made the interior space more receptive to open natural lighting and more accommodating for free movement.

The roof members are curved and shallow. The W33x169 girders are cold bent with reverse curves to multiple radii. The curved roof planes are suspended from German "full-lock" steel cables and include three outer layers of interlocking Z-shaped wires designed to minimize water infiltration and corrosion.

The engineering of the masts was complicated because stability was so important to the overall design success of the suspension structure.  Mast displacements could significantly alter cable length and tension and redistribute loads through the superstructure contrary to design.  The key to successful design was control of the foundation settlement.  The sites natural underlying subsurface conditions were stiff silty clay below a medium dense sand layer, which was determined to be too accommodating to settlement to host the structure.  Ground improvement, consisting of triple-fluid jet grouting, was performed to reduce the compressibility of the silty clay, stiffen the sand deposit and provide a desirable shallow foundation system.  This site marked the first time that these geotechnical ground improvement techniques were employed.

Reception
The facility's engineering and design has earned it awards from the American Council of Engineering Companies, the American Institute of Steel Construction, and the Consulting Engineers Council of Illinois.  The building earned a Merit Award in the category of new buildings in the $30 million and over category in the National Council of Structural Engineers Associations 2004 Excellence in Structural Engineering Awards program.  The building earned the 2003 Outstanding Civil Engineering Achievement of the Year award by the American Society of Civil Engineers and the 2004 Project of the Year Overall by Midwest Construction News.

Notes

External links
 Official webpage
 Structure Magazine archived news article
 from modernsteel.com

Sports venues in Chicago
University of Chicago
Chicago Maroons men's basketball
College basketball venues in the United States
College volleyball venues in the United States
College wrestling venues in the United States
Basketball venues in Chicago
Swimming venues in Chicago
Volleyball venues in Chicago
Wrestling venues in Chicago
Modernist architecture in Illinois
High-tech architecture
Postmodern architecture in the United States
Sports venues completed in 2003
César Pelli buildings
Health clubs in the United States
Medical and health organizations based in Illinois
2003 establishments in Illinois
Suspended structures